Adelino Teixeira (born 21 March 1954) is a Portuguese former professional road cyclist. He notably won the Volta a Portugal in 1977, the Volta ao Algarve in 1981, the Grande Prémio Jornal de Notícias in 1983 and the Volta ao Alentejo in 1985.

Major results

1977
 1st  Overall Volta a Portugal
1st Stages 4 & 11
 2nd Overall Volta ao Algarve
1st Stage 3
1978
 2nd Overall Grande Prémio do Minho
1st Stage 4b
 3rd Overall Volta ao Algarve
 7th Overall Volta a Portugal
1979
 3rd Overall Volta ao Algarve
 10th Overall Volta a Portugal
1981
 1st Overall 
 2nd Overall Volta ao Algarve
 2nd Overall GP Torres Vedras
 3rd Overall Volta a Portugal
1982
 1st Stage 7 Volta ao Algarve
 2nd Overall Volta a Portugal
1st Stage 8b
1983
 1st  Overall Volta ao Algarve
1st Stage 4
 1st  Overall Grande Prémio Jornal de Notícias
 1st Stage 5 GP Torres Vedras
1984
 4th Overall Volta a Portugal
1985
 1st  Overall Volta ao Alentejo
1st Stage 3b
 2nd Road race, National Road Championships
 8th Overall Volta a Portugal

References

External links

1954 births
Living people
Portuguese male cyclists
Volta a Portugal winners